"Seishun Hanamichi" (青春花道; English: "Youth runway") is the thirty-eighth single by the Japanese pop rock band Porno Graffitti. It was released on September 11, 2013.

Track listing

References

2013 singles
Porno Graffitti songs
SME Records singles